Isotominae is a subfamily of elongate-bodied springtails in the family Isotomidae. There are about 15 genera and at least 100 described species in Isotominae.

Genera
These 15 genera belong to the subfamily Isotominae:

 Agrenia Boerner, 1906 i g b
 Axelsonia Boener, 1906 i c g
 Degamaea Yosii, 1965 i c g
 Desoria Agassiz & Nicolet, 1841 c g b
 Hydroisotoma Stach, 1947 g b
 Isotoma Bourlet, 1839 i c g b
 Isotomiella Bagnall, 1939 i c g b
 Isotomurus Boerner, 1903 i c g b
 Metisotoma Maynard, 1951 i c g b
 Micrisotoma Bellinger, 1952 i c g
 Parisotoma Bagnall, 1940 c g b
 Pseudisotoma Handschin, 1924 g b
 Scutisotoma Bagnall, 1949 g b
 Semicerura Maynard, 1951 i c g
 Vertagopus Börner, 1906 g b

Data sources: i = ITIS, c = Catalogue of Life, g = GBIF, b = Bugguide.net

References

Further reading

External links

 

Entomobryomorpha
Arthropod subfamilies